is a former Japanese football player.

Playing career
Nakajima was born in Kanagawa Prefecture on June 28, 1979. After graduating from high school, he joined his local club Atsugi Marcus in 1998. In 2000, he moved to Kowada SC. In September 2001, he moved to J2 League club Ventforet Kofu. However he could hardly play in the match and left the club end of 2002 season. After 1 year blank, he joined Japan Football League (JFL) club Denso and played as regular player in 2 seasons. In 2006, he moved to Regional Leagues club Fervorosa Ishikawa Hakuzan FC. In 2007, he moved to Prefectural Leagues club Cobaltore Onagawa. Cobaltore was promoted to Regional Leagues from 2008. In August 2011, he moved to JFL club V-Varen Nagasaki on loan because Cobaltore skipped the 2011 season for 2011 Tōhoku earthquake and tsunami. In 2012, he returned to Cobaltore and retired end of 2014 season.

Club statistics

References

External links

1979 births
Living people
Association football people from Kanagawa Prefecture
Japanese footballers
Association football midfielders
J2 League players
Japan Football League players
Ventforet Kofu players
FC Kariya players
Cobaltore Onagawa players
V-Varen Nagasaki players